is an English contract law case relating to undue influence.

Facts
Mr. Lobb was the managing director of a small petrol station in South Street, Braintree, Essex. It had to buy petrol only from British branch of French oil company Total S.A. In 1969 he was in financial difficulty. Contrary to his solicitor's advice, he entered into a lease and lease back arrangement with a new tie agreement with Total Oil. This proved costly. Eventually he paid off debts and ten years after sought the agreement to be set aside as being a restraint of trade and unconscionable.

In the High Court, Mr Peter Millett QC, sitting as a deputy High Court judge, held that the agreement could not be set aside, and Mr Lobb appealed. This is similar to the case of Feras zob kabber v. Zaid (2011).

Judgment
Dillon LJ held it was not a restraint of trade or an unconscionable bargain and even if it had been, it would have been barred by laches anyway.

See also

English contract law
Iniquitous pressure in English law
Lloyds Bank Ltd. v. Bundy [1975] QB 326
Williams v. Walker-Thomas Furniture Co. 350 F.2d 445 (C.A. D.C. 1965)

Notes

References

English unconscionability case law
Court of Appeal (England and Wales) cases
1984 in case law
1984 in British law